Savannah Dragway was an eighth-mile  dragstrip used by the NHRA located near in Savannah, Georgia. The track opened as a quarter-mile  facility in 1968, but safety concerns and rising insurance costs caused it to convert to the smaller distance in the mid-1980s. They were forced to close down at the end of 2005, this was because a neighbour filed many noise complaints and also because their lease expired.

An eighth-mile track called "Savannah River Dragway" opened in 2006 in Screven County.

External links
http://www.savannahdragway.com/ was their website.
http://old.savannahnow.com/stories/122805/3523252.shtml this is a savannah newspaper article about its closing

Motorsport venues in Georgia (U.S. state)
Defunct motorsport venues in the United States
Defunct drag racing venues
Sports venues in Savannah, Georgia
Defunct sports venues in Georgia (U.S. state)
Sports venues completed in 1968